IC 4756 is a large bright open cluster in the constellation Serpens. Known as Graff's Cluster, it is bright enough to be seen with the naked eye and considered a fine cluster for binoculars or small telescopes.

IC 4756 is also known as the Tweedledee Cluster (paired with NGC 6633 as Tweedledum), also as the Secret Garden Cluster.

Metallicity of IC 4756 is similar to the Sun, at -0.02 dex.

Stars

There are some noteworthy stars in the cluster. HD 172365 is a likely post-blue straggler in the IC 4756 that contains a large excess of lithium. HD 172189, also in IC 4756, is an Algol variable eclipsing binary with a 5.70 day period. The primary star in the system is also a Delta Scuti variable, undergoing multiple pulsation frequencies, which, combined with the eclipses, causes the system to vary by around a tenth of a magnitude.

References

External links
 
 

4756
Open clusters
Serpens (constellation)